T-34 is a 2019 Russian war film written and directed by Aleksey Sidorov. The title references the T-34, a World War II-era Soviet medium tank used during the defense of the Soviet Union. The film narrates the life of Nikolai Ivushkin, a tank commander who gets captured by the Germans. Three years later, he begins to plan his ultimate escape, alongside his newly recruited tank crew. It stars Alexander Petrov as Junior Lieutenant Ivushkin, with Viktor Dobronravov, Irina Starshenbaum, Anton Bogdanov, Yuri Borisov, Semyon Treskunov, and Artyom Bystrov.

T-34 was released in Russia by Central Partnership on January 1, 2019, and for hire converted into IMAX format. The film was released to generally positive reviews, with critics praising the production quality and visual effects. It was successful commercially, grossing 2.2 billion rubles (about $32 million), against a production budget of 600 million rubles, after a week in cinemas. It is in second place on Russia's biggest blockbusters list with over 8.5 million viewers and 2 billion rubles, and is currently the fourth-highest grossing Russian film of all time.

Plot 
In November 1941, just outside Moscow, Red Army Junior Lieutenant Nikolay Ivushkin (Alexander Petrov) is driving a ramshackle truck and trailer with a young private named Vasiliy beside him. A German Panzer III tank appears over a hill and opens fire on them. Nikolay, who has been trained as an armor officer, maneuvers skillfully and they escape uninjured, and alive, though very shaken up.

Nikolay is assigned to command a damaged T-34 tank whose commander was killed, with orders to delay the Germans' advance with only the single tank and a small number of supporting infantry. Nikolay and his crew lay an ambush for a platoon of German panzers commanded by Klaus Jäger (Vinzenz Kiefer). Through a combination of guile and bravery, their t-34 destroys six panzers, but in a final duel with Jäger's command panzer, both tanks are disabled, and half the Russian tank crew is killed, and Nikolay and driver Stepan Vasilyonok captured.

Three years later, in 1944, Jäger, now a Standartenführer, gains permission from Reichsführer-SS Heinrich Himmler and General Heinz Guderian to recruit an experienced tank crew from Soviet POWs in a concentration camp to act as opponents for training the 12th SS Panzer Division Hitlerjugend. Nikolay has been a prisoner for three years, and has refused to give his name, but Jäger recognizes his photograph from the camp records. Jäger proposes the idea to Nikolay through the camp's interpreter, bilingual Russian prisoner Anya (Irina Starshenbaum). At first Nikolay refuses, but agrees after Jäger threatens to kill Anya.

Nikolay picks out three other tankers from the POWs – driver Vasilyonok, loader Serafim Ionov, and gunner Demyan Volchok—to crew a T-34/85 that the Germans just captured. At first, the other tankers refuse to take part, but Nikolay says he has a plan to escape.

The Germans first order the Soviet prisoners to clear out the rotting and burned bodies from inside the tank, but as they remove the bodies, they unexpectedly find a small number of remaining live shells and hand grenades. Granted permission to bury their comrades, they hide the munitions with the bodies in a cairn on the edge of the training grounds. Not trusting the Soviets, Jäger orders anti-tank mines laid around the entirety of the training grounds. Anya convinces Nikolay to let her escape with them, as only she can steal a map from Jäger's office showing a safe route out of the area, and gain a pass letting her out of the camp for a day.

Before the training exercise, Nikolay and his crew retrieve the munitions and create a smoke screen to mask their movements. Believing the T-34 is unarmed, the Germans are unprepared when the trainees' first Panther tank is knocked out, and a second shell is fired directly into the observation tower, killing most of the officers inside, except for Jäger and Guderian, who jump out at the last second. The T-34 boldly storms through the training grounds’ car park (crushing many of the officers’ staff cars) and breaks through the main gate, avoiding the minefield. The tankers pick up Anya at a bus stop outside the camp; with her map, Nikolay plots a course toward Czechoslovakia and back to the Red Army's lines. In the first town they come to, Nikolay and his hungry crew find badly needed fuel, new clothing, and fresh food. They burn their ragged prisoner clothes as they drive out of town.

They encounter an anti-tank blockade, boasting a towed anti-tank gun, and barely manage to escape with only a deep gouge in the side armor of the right side of the turret, thanks to Nikolay’s franticly shouted order of “left!!” They weave back through the woods, avoiding the gun and its crew, and cross the road again out of sight and disappear into the deep forest for a while, until they are in the clear.

After driving on for a few hours, Stepan suggests that the beast is good, but will overheat soon, so they pull of into the woods to rest for the night.

At first, Nikolay suggests abandoning the tank and splitting up, believing they have a better chance of survival if they separate, but the crew insist on staying with him, also reluctant to leave their beloved beast. Before dawn, knowing that the Germans will be hunting them, Nikolay puts Anya out of their tank and tells her to make her way east on foot through the forests. Jäger meanwhile takes to the sky in a Fieseler Storch to find Nikolay's T-34. He then takes command of four Panthers and prepares an ambush in the small town of Klingenthal.

At night, the T-34 enters the town and stumbles into the first of the four Panthers. Instead of trying to pierce its front armor, Volchok fires a shot under its hull that ricochets off the pavement and penetrates its underbelly.  Nikolay realizes they are surrounded by the remaining three Panthers, including Jäger's. Knowing they need to distract the other crews, he sends out Volchok, armed only with a grenade, to disable one. Vasilyonok crashes their T-34 through building walls before unexpectedly having a near collision with one of the other Panthers. The Russians manually turn their damaged turret and get a shot off just as the Germans are about to fire, destroying the panzer, due to an ammo rack explosion, rattling the T-34 tank and the crew, stunning them. Meanwhile, the two other Panthers have arrived on the scene and one takes aim at Nikolay. However, Volchok manages to fire a shell out of the German tank he just captured. The third Panther is disabled, but Jäger quickly disposes of the captured Panther, badly wounding Volchok.

Both Jäger and Nikolay emerge from the cupolas of their tanks. Jäger throws down his glove, inviting Nikolay to a duel. Nikolay asks for five minutes to pick up the wounded Volchok. Both tanks then move outside the town and face off over a narrow stone bridge across the river. As the tanks charge at each other, Jäger fires several shots at the T-34, but fails to disable it, while Nikolay waits to fire their last shell directly through the driver's vision port. As in early production, Panthers still had driver’s view port hatch. The two tanks fire simultaneously, badly damaging but not disabling each other, however, Jäger’s crew is killed, leaving him alive, but badly wounded. Out of ammunition, Nikolay orders Vasilyonok to ram Jäger's tank, pushing it to the edge of the bridge. Jäger crawls out of his Panther while Nikolay aims a stolen rifle at him. Jäger shouts for Nikolay to shoot him, but Nikolay offers his foe mercy. Jäger extends his hand and the two adversaries exchange a handshake of respect. Nikolay tries to pull Jäger to safety, but Jäger lets go, allowing himself to fall to his death as his Panther tips over the bridge and plummets into the river.

With their tank's tracks disabled, the crew reunites with Anya outside the town, carrying the wounded Volchok on a makeshift stretcher, and they make their way towards the Russian lines on foot.

The film ends with a dedication to the Red Army tank crews of the Great Patriotic War, all of whom earned the status of heroes for fighting against the invasion of their country.

Cast
 Alexander Petrov as Junior Lieutenant Nikolay Ivushkin, tank officer
 Vinzenz Kiefer as SS-Standartenführer Klaus Jäger
 Viktor Dobronravov as Sergeant Stepan Vasilyonok, tank driver
 Irina Starshenbaum as Anya Yartseva, a translator in a concentration camp
 Yuri Borisov as Serafim Ionov, loader of the T-34-85 (1944)
 Anton Bogdanov as Demyan Volchkov "Volchok", tank gunner (1944)
 Artur Sopelnik as Red Army man Ivan Kobzarenko, loader of the T-34-76 (1941)
 Pyotr Skvortsov as Andrey Lykov, machine gunner (1941)
 Semyon Treskunov as Red Army man Vasiliy Teterin "Teterya", lorry driver
 Guram Bablishvili as Starshina Guram Gabuliya, commander of the infantry squad
 Danila Rassomakhin as Vasechkin
 Artyom Bystrov as Captain Mikhail Korin
 Wolfgang Cerny as Wolf Hein, tank sniper
 Dirc Simpson as Grimm, the camp commandant
 Joshua Grothe as Thielicke

Rest of cast listed alphabetically 
 Mike Davies as Generalinspekteur der Panzertruppe Heinz Guderian
 Igor Khripunov as Lapikov
 Robinson Reichel as Reichsführer-SS Heinrich Himmler
 Yaroslav Shtefanov as Makeev, machine-gunner 
 Anton Shurtsov as Chief of staff
 Christoph Urban as Schlozer
 Alexandr Zaporozhets as Petya
 Elena Drobysheva as Nikolay Ivushkin's mother

Production

Development 
On September 10, 2015, it was announced that the Mars Media film company would start production of the high-budget war action drama T-34.
Later, producer Leonard Blavatnik, an investor, owner of Amedia and Warner Music Studios, joined the project and chose this film from a large number of proposals, which was also due to personal motives (as Blavatnik's grandfather was a Red Army soldier), and other reasons - the best young artists, a first-class film crew and the successful experience of a partner, Mars Media, and personally Ruben Dishdishyan.

Filming 
The shooting process of T-34 started on 23 February and continued for 61 days. Some scenes were shot in Moscow, Kaluga and Moscow regions, others in the Czech Republic, Prague, Kačina (library), Loket (Sokolov District), Rudolfinum and Terezin. For the picture, more than 25 scale sceneries were built, among them a Russian village and a prisoner of war camp.
Five military-historical consultants took part in the making of the film.

Pre-production 
In the film, several real T-34 tanks were remade and updated for the film. The film also used several German and Soviet vehicles, such as the Sd.Kfz. 251 half-track. The Panther tanks with Zimmerit paste were made from T-55 tanks distinguishable by the five large main wheels.

Production designer Konstantin Pagutin spent a whole month building an entire village in a field near the village of Starlkowka, Kluj County, although the houses were destroyed at the beginning of the film, each one was designed in its own particular style, including hand-picked decorations and props.

Release 
The film was scheduled to be released on December 27, 2018, in cinemas, but instead the picture was released on January 1, 2019, five days later than the planned date, distributors such as the Central Partnership and for rental converted to IMAX format.

Marketing 
T-34 premiered at Comic-Con Russia 2018, the most attended Russian festival of pop culture, which took place in Moscow from 4 to 7 in October and once again beat attendance records, was held by the Central Partnership company.

Reception

Box office
On the first day of release, the Russian box office amounted to 111,335,337 rubles.

Call for censorship 
The Ukrainian Embassy in USA called on local U.S. cinemas to ban the film because they saw it as justifying and promoting Moscow’s hostile foreign and security policy.

Critical response
The film received mixed ratings. According to the aggregator “Criticism” - 5.5 / 10 (based on 26 reviews).

Some publications after the publication of the trailer and the premiere of the film wrote about the similarity of the story with the plot of the 1965 Soviet war film The Lark, noting that T-34 cannot be considered a remake of The Lark: both the method of presentation and the general outline of the narrative, and the ending of these two films are very different.

According to film critic Anton Dolin, the authors made a high-budget military blockbuster, almost clearing it of the propaganda and ideological component: «The film about the Great Patriotic War successfully managed without patriotic propaganda».
The creators do not pretend that the T-34 is a picture of real events, at its core it is «a pure fantasy adapted for teenagers». The critic notes the schematic plot and the weak study of the characters' characters. «This is exemplary fearlessness, this programmatic heroism is a little embarrassing. At first, you don’t understand what. And then you remember what T-34 is building up its genealogy: for Soviet films about the war. In the best of them, the adversaries were not the Germans, as here, but the war as such. In Fate of a Man, Ivan's Childhood, The Cranes Are Flying, Ballad of a Soldier, and Trial on the Road, for all the differences, there was one conceptual similarity: they showed how a person retains his humanity through the desire for peace and memory about him. The space T-34 is arranged fundamentally different. It is given to a total never-ending war in which comforting simplicity reigns: there are ours, there are enemies, and enemies must be beaten to a victorious end. Without pain and bitterness, with excitement and frenzy of the players of the computer championship».

Browser "Novaya Gazeta" Larisa Malyukova reflects on the role of tanks in modern Russian cinema. Sidorov took into account the shortcomings of the «tank» films of 2018 Tankers (film) and Tanks (ru): «In his picture, the propaganda itch was partly tamed by uncomplicated adventures and vigorous battles, seasoned with humor, and reddened by love bliss».
Like Dolin, Malyukova compares the film with Soviet films on a military theme: «In those films, the Faulkner idea was beating with a living pulse: one cannot come from a war as a winner. They were aware of the global catastrophe, which was for our people the Second World War. In the latest domestic cinema war, one cannot find the author's point of view. Instead of resorting to myth, mythologization of history. Instead of the anti-war spirit - the motto is “We can repeat it!”, A call to achievement. Instead of a brutal clever enemy - solid idiots. The romanticization of war, the feeling of the ease of victory covers the screen».

The critic Valery Kichin writes in Rossiyskaya Gazeta that one cannot form an idea of what the Great Patriotic War is in reality: «According to the plot, this is a legend like Bumbarash or The Elusive Avengers, in style - a script for a computer game called T-34. That is, spectacles are primarily spectacular and gambling».
The dashing adventurous plot, the conditional situation of the action, the peculiar beauty even in the process of destruction - «yes, this is a movie about the feat of arms of the very folk hero who, as you know, rides, rides, doesn't whistle, but doesn’t let him go. And the authors, undoubtedly, were inspired by the style of the battle quest: they use game techniques that are well-known to the modern viewer, and the wonderful feeling that the characters have several lives in stock accompanies the entire film. And the actors here are not so much playing as playing: at the moments of the most implausible plot somersaults, a sly spark of cheerful excitement slips in their eyes. This sincerity removes all claims: people who went through a real front removed military classics, now people with combat experience in the quest have come, they have different skills and ideas about the war».

Evgeny Bazhenov, a video blogger and columnist for Russian YouTube films, (known by his pseudonym BadComedian) criticized the film in its video review. According to the observer, the film is historically unreliable and justifies Nazism, concentration camps in the film are shown harmless, and SS Klaus is shown as almost a positive character, which rather offends the memory of the heroes of the Great Patriotic War than perpetuates it. ( on YouTube)

Accolades

See also
 The Lark (1965 film), a Soviet film
 White Tiger (2012 film)
 Fury (2014 film)

References

External links 
 
 
 

2019 films
2010s Russian-language films
2010s action war films
Russian action war films
Russian historical action films
Eastern Front of World War II films
Films about armoured warfare
Films set in the Soviet Union
Films set in Europe
World War II prisoner of war films
Fiction about tanks
Films shot in Russia
Films shot in the Czech Republic
Russian World War II films
Mars Media films
Mosfilm films
World War II films based on actual events
Films produced by Nikita Mikhalkov